For the real-life aircraft known as a Vertibird, see Tiltrotor

VertiBird  was the name of a line of toy helicopter products made by Mattel between 1971 and the early 1980s.

Description

General
The VertiBird helicopter flies around a central base containing an electric motor, spring lift assist, pitch control, batteries, and a throttle. A 21-inch arm with pitch control rod and the spindle that transfers the power to helicopter via drive springs and drive rod, is connected from the central base to the helicopter.

The original VertiBird playset has a space theme appropriate for the Space Age attitude of the 1970s.  The first set was reminiscent of the Project Mercury program.  Later versions of the VertiBird would continue to revisit the space theme as well as other popular television and movie themes of the 1970s and early 1980s time frames.

Box contents
The box contents of the average VertiBird playset consisted of the following items:
 Cardboard packing for the Vertibird.  Holds the VertiBird and rotor  Also has punchouts as noted below.
 VertiBird with base and controls and helicopter mostly preassembled (except as noted in version list below).
 Cardboard skill accessories. (cardboard punchout Landing Platform)
- Accessory bag with the following items.
 VertiBird Instructions.
 Label stickers for the VertiBird and accessories.
 Two-bladed plastic rotor with safety rubber tips.
 Skyhook.
 Pickup accessories. (Astronaut, Space Capsule)
 Plastic skill accessories. (Life raft)

Other versions of the VertiBird also included:
 Molded forms for the base and controls that were set theme specific. (Rescue Ship, Polar Adventure)
 Punch-out cardboard buildings that are playset theme specific. (Airborne Rescue)
 Glow-in-the-dark luminous Label stickers for the Vertibird and accessories. (Night Patrol)
 Play mats. (Paramedic Rescue)
 Site accessories that are playset theme specific. (Polar Adventure, Battlestar Galactica)
 Various other pickup items that were set theme specific.

Power
Power was provided by 4 'D' sized alkaline batteries in the base. They also doubled as the weight to hold down the base.

Flight
The helicopter is controlled using a two-lever control unit.  The controls operate similarly to a real helicopter.  The throttle control provides proportional control of the blade speed.  The pitch control provides for tilting the Vertibird forward or backward.  During the flight, the VertiBird is subject to the same physical flight characteristics as a real helicopter.  This included ground effects for low-level hovering, plus altitude gains and losses when changing direction.  Overall the VertiBird is easy to learn how to pilot for basic flight, but precision flying will require some patience and time on the controls as in a real helicopter.

As noted there is a spring assist to lift the VertiBird. However, in actual operation, the assist is not enough to lift the VertiBird off the ground.  Most of the lift comes from the spinning rotor itself.  Subsequently, dropping heavy items during a flight will result in a very rapid ascension of the VertiBird unless the pilot has good flight skills.

Mattel designed the set with the young flyer in mind.  The VertiBird can take quite a beating during crashes and toybox storage.  This design has resulted in a toy that has survived over 38 years and remains as fun today as it was when VertiBird first came on the market back in 1971.

The one exception to the required VertiBird flight skills was the introduction of the Space: 1999 themed playset, which did not feature the "VertiBird" branding on its packaging elements.  The Space: 1999 version was the one playset that (more or less) abandoned the VertiBird concept in favor of a look and feels to match television series. The set had controls that were radically different from the standard VertiBird controls.  The Eagle (helicopter) was fully supported by controls.  The set used only two C-cell-sized batteries.  The throttle provided nothing more than a switch to spin the rotor.  Effectively there was no lift provided by the rotor and instead, all lifting is performed with the controls using hand strength.  This set would not be a good version for the first-time VertiBird pilot wanting to have a true VertiBird experience.  Considered notable only for its Space: 1999 theme tie-in and high collector value. But otherwise a poorly performing VertiBird set.  The later Battlestar Galactica playset successfully blended the VertiBird concept with a science fiction space theme and uses the actual power of the thrust from the rotor to lift other playset objects.

Popularity
The average retail price for most VertiBirds back during the 1970s was between $8.00 and $20.00(USD).

Today, with more and more people collecting and restoring them, collectors are willing to pay over $400 for a working Vertibird.  On July 31, 2006, a "mint in box" Vertibird sold for $500 on eBay, with 4 individual bidders bidding at least $400.

Earlier eBay sales were also noted for final sale prices in excess of $1200.00 for the extremely rare Space: 1999 themed playset in unplayed, brand new, (C-10) condition. In 2005, a complete, near-mint condition set of the German "Libelle 12 Polizeihubschrauber" (considered by some collectors to be the second-rarest worldwide VertiBird variant after the "Space: 1999" model, although other internationally issued sets - in particular the Canadian "Okanagan Logging 'Copter" - appear to be much less common than the "Libelle") changed hands for $850 in a private sale.

Distribution and licensing
Distribution was not limited to the United States.  Mattel produced international versions of the VertiBird playset for various markets including Canada, Brazil, the UK, Germany, and Italy.  Just when it seems the final international VertiBird version has been found, another is reported. To date, it is unknown just how many markets and languages Mattel distributed the VertiBird into. The most recent "new" variant to the surface is a Mexican version of the "Polar Adventure" set, offered on eBay in mid-November 2008.

Mattel also licensed the VertiBird for production by other companies.  At least two are known (see the list below).

In the media
Several Mattel VertiBird commercials were made in the 1970s and early 1980s.  One of the advertising agencies used for production was Ogilvy & Mather.

In a Christmas-themed episode of That '70s Show, Eric Forman can be seen playing with the VertiBird in a basement scene.

Tiltwing aircraft called "Vertibirds" (although different in appearance, it resembles a cross between a Dragonfly and a V-22 Osprey), appear in the games Fallout 2, Fallout 3, Fallout: New Vegas, and Fallout 4.

Similar VertiBird toys and games
In addition to the VertiBird itself, there are several other pre-VertiBird and post-VertiBird units covering various eras, global regions and business lines. Some units like the Dan Dare (see list below) were home-usage toy sets.  Others such as the WhirlyBird were skill games meant for arcade distribution or another location-based business usage.  All units share VertiBird's basic premise of fun by allowing the user actively control the helicopter, while still providing a safe and easily controllable experience.

VertiBird versions
There are 13 known different US versions of the VertiBird playsets.  The original VertiBird had an early manufacturing change that modified the drive spring to drive rod coupling.  The first version had the end of the drive rod screwed into the drive spring on the helicopter.  The production modification resulted in the drive rod being permanently soldered to the drive spring and packaged the base, controls, rods, and helicopter (except the rotor) into one complete unit.

In addition to the different US versions, other international versions were produced.  These international VertiBird versions were localized as needed for language, playset graphics, pictures, and local service depot information as required.

There were also some contracted production runs of the Mattel VertiBird for other companies.

Grouped all together, there are currently 23 different known variations.  Every year or so it seems a new variation is discovered somewhere around the globe.

In February 2015, an American eBay seller with immaculate feedback offered several pieces of supposedly original conceptual art by former Mattel designer Tom Hodges, which featured graphic layouts for a number of unproduced VertiBird variants from the mid-to-late 1970s. These included a "Spacehawk X7" intergalactic probe model (undated), a "Medivac" military-themed set (1975), a "Disaster Air Rescue" version (1975), a "Space War" sci-fi model (1978), and a 1979 M*A*S*H -a themed set that was obviously meant to tie in with the successful TV series.

USA versions
 1971 - Set No. 5972 -           - VertiBird. (Version 1, screw-connected drive spring)
 1971 - Set No. 5972 -           - VertiBird. (Version 2, drive spring soldered in place. All subsequent USA and International versions)
 1973 - Set No. 7604 -           - VertiBird Air Police. (themed to tie into police TV shows of the 1970s)
 197? - Set No. 7646 -           - VertiBird Polar Adventure.
 1973 - Set No. 8243 -           - VertiBird Rescue Ship. (Another space-themed set tying into the Apollo program)
 1975 - Set No. 9040 - 79-58256C - VertiBird Paramedic Rescue. (Themed to tie into the Emergency! TV series)
 197? - Set No. 9780 -           - VertiBird Airborne Rescue. 
 1976 - Set No. 8997 -           - VertiBird Okanagan Logging 'Copter. (Also released in Canada)
 1976 - Set No. 9637 -           - Space: 1999 Flying Eagle. (Not branded as "VertiBird" on its packaging elements; tie-in to Space: 1999 TV series.)
 1978 - Set No. 2898 - VertiBird S.W.A.T. Patrol. (Themed to tie into the S.W.A.T. TV series.)
 1979 - Set No. 1675 - 1675-0970 - VertiBird Night Patrol (included  phosphorescent plastic parts and stickers)
 1979 - Set No. 2983 - 2983-0970 - VertiBird Battlestar Galactica. (Battlestar Galactica TV series tie-in)
 1981 - Set No. 5306 -           - VertiBird Megaforce. (Megaforce Movie tie-in)

International versions
Localized for language and/or graphics.

Brazil (Brasil)
Manufactured under the Brazilian Brand "Brinquedos Estrela" (Toys Star)
 1984 - Set No. 22.13.13 (Brazilian Issue) - VertiPlano. (Brazilian, original version VertiBird).
 1984 - Set No. 22.13.15 (Brazilian Issue) - VertiPlano. (Brazilian, original version VertiBird).
 2000 - Set No. 22.03.66 (Brazilian Issue) - Vertiplano Estrela C/ Caixa - Helicóptero De Resgate. (Brazilian, Vertiplano Star C / Box - From Helicopter Rescue version VertiBird.  Reissued series version with new colors.).

Canada
 1971 - Set No. 5972 (Canadian Issue) - VertiBird. (Canadian version set)
 1973 - Set No. 7604 (Canadian Issue) - VertiBird Air Police/Police De L'Air. (Canadian version Air Police set)
 1976 - Set No. 8997 - VertiBird Okanagan Logging 'Copter. (also released in the USA)

Germany
 1978 - Set No. 2677-0919 - Libelle 12 Polizeihubschrauber (German version of "Air Police" set). This much sought-after model did not feature any reference to the "VertiBird" series on its packaging elements despite being a genuine Mattel product. Collectors should take note that two different versions exist of the "Libelle 12" set; the more common one contains the getaway car, road barrier, and radar receiver made of red plastic, while the much scarcer second variant had these same accessory pieces molded from clear plastic instead. Also, a rare early packaging artwork variation featured Mattel's "Hot Wheels" logo added to the lid of the box and employed a smaller, less prominent "Libelle 12" logo. Whereas the original German retail price for the "Libelle 12" was in the range of around DM 35, near-mint/unplayed sets auctioned off on eBay.de between January 2009 and May 2012 realized final bids from €90 to €150.

Italy
 1978 - Set No. 2675-0920 - VertiBird Elicottero Carabinieri (Italian version of "Airborne Rescue Mission" set). It is of note that the initial version of this set featured the original US "Airborne Rescue Mission" packaging (containing two different instruction manuals in both English and Italian), while the second version - in a different red box - was fully adjusted for the domestic market and came with the Italian-language manual only. Also, early Mattel ads published in Italy promoted the toy as "Elicottero S.O.S. Mattel" and utilized a picture of the US model (yellow helicopter and white base/control unit), although the actual "Elicottero Carabinieri" set consisted of a black helicopter and red operating elements. 
 1980 - Set No. 3017-0926 - VertiBird Veicolo Spaziale Mazinga "Z" (Battlestar Galactica TV series theme). This is basically the same set as the 1979 US "Battlestar Galactica" version, adapted (and renamed) for the Italian market.

Japan
Manufactured under the Japanese Brand "Takara".
 19?? - Set No. ???? (Japanese Issue) - VertiBird Helicopter Technic. Likely the Japanese market version of the Air Police version. The graphics and colors included in this set are very different. Also, the radar antenna has a different shape and is attached to the motor base in a completely different method. Also, the control handles functions are reversed as compared to the USA sets. Direction is on the left side and power is on the right side. Also, the control handle shape for the power control does not have the right-angle extension as seen in the USA set controls. Otherwise, the Takara-branded set flies the same.

Mexico
1973 - Set No. ???? - VertiBird Estacion Polar (Mexican version of "Polar Adventure" set), manufactured and distributed by domestic toy company "CIPSA (Compania de Plasticos S.A.)" with original "VertiBird" branding.

United Kingdom
 1976 - Set No. 9780 (UK Issue) - VertiBird Airborne Rescue.

Contracted Vertibird versions

Bluebird Air Police contracted set by Mattel
 197? - Set No. PT-681 - Bluebird Air Police.  Distribution in Canada and Europe.  Produced during the same period as the Mattel branded set.

Burbank Toys contracted set by Mattel
 1973 - Set No.7604 - Burbank Toys Issue Air Police. Produced during the same period as the Mattel branded set.

Takara Co Ltd Japan Licensed Design
 197? - Set No. ?? - Helicopter Technic. Vertibird design licensed from Mattel by Takara Co Ltd for production and sale in Japan. Produced in the late 1970s to the early 1980s era.

Other VertiBird-like toys and games

Pre-VertiBird Era similar sets 
Childs and Smith (Atherstone, Warwickshire, England):
 195? - Set No. ???? - Dan Dare (aka Nulli Secundus) Landing Mat Game.  European release.  Electric tin toy set similar to VertiBird, probably from the 1950s.

Knickerbocker (North Hollywood, California):
 195?/196? - Set No. ???? - Fly It Yourself Remote Control Helicopter. Early battery-operated flight toy with aluminum helicopter and paper landing mats.

Maline:
 195? - Set No. ???? - MARX-A-COPTER, Ship version. Made by Louis Marx and Company
 195? - Set No. ???? - MARX-A-COPTER, Space Version. Many accessories. A space-themed playset from the pre-Apollo era. Made by Louis Marx and Company

VertiBird Era similar sets, spin-offs and knock-offs
Amusement Engineering Inc.:
 1968 - Model No. ???? - Helicopter Trainer.  Coin-operated arcade and location-based skill game. Direction and speed controlled.  Also included scoring posts that were electrically operated by contact.

Sega Enterprises Inc.:
 1968 - Model No. ???? - Helicopter.  Coin-operated arcade and location-based skill game. Direction and speed controlled.  Also included scoring pads that were electrically operated by contact.  Also had an 8-track tape for sound effects.

Midway:
 1969 - Model No. 601 - Whirly Bird.  Coin-operated arcade and location-based skill game. Direction and speed controlled.  Also included scoring posts that were electrically operated by contact.
 1974 - Model No. 583 - Chopper.  Coin-operated arcade and location-based skill game. Direction and speed controlled.  Also included scoring target that were light sensor operated.  Also had an 8-track tape for sound effects.

Mattel:
 1973 - Set No. 8263 - Snoopy & His Flyin' Doghouse. An original Mattel product that utilized their VertiBird concept, but instead of a helicopter featured Peanuts cartoon character Snoopy as the "flying ace" on his doghouse (with horizontally attached front propeller). Accessories included "Red Baron" and "German Balloon" cardboard cutout targets and a Charlie Brown & Woodstock flying pylon. A version for the Canadian market (same set number, with the toy actually made in Mexico) also exists featuring a bilingual (English/French-language) box and instructions.
 1978 - Set No. 2433 (US) / 2433-0980 (Europe) - Dareplane Wingwalker Stunt Set. A completely re-designed version of Mattel's earlier (1972) "Dareplane Stunter" flight toy that had worked on thin, flexible cables (which made it difficult for young kids to properly navigate the plane) and was prone to quick damage, with countless sets being returned for exchange to toy stores and Mattel itself within just a few days after purchase. Having the original cable connections replaced by a solid plastic arm that no longer allowed to do "loops" and the like, the later "Wingwalker" version generally operated in a way that was a lot more similar to the VertiBird concept (even including a sky-hook retractable from the plane, as well as several pick-up items) - in fact, the only thing these two toys had in common was the name. Other than the 1972 "Dareplane," which had been available in North America only, the "Wingwalker" set also was released in Europe, but enjoyed little success on either market and thus disappeared from shelves rather quickly.

Simpsons-Sears (Canada):
 197? - Set No. ???? - Helicopter. This set contained a yellow chopper, control unit, operating unit, connection gear, cardboard landing mat (with assembly instructions printed on the back), and various pick-up items. Made in Hong Kong.

Good Play (Germany):
 197? - Set No. ???? - Super Helicopter. Contained a white chopper, control/operating unit (one piece), connection gear, and plastic landing mat.

Remco Controlled Space Flight (CSF):
 1976 - Set No. 602 - Star Trek CSF.
 1976 - Set No. ??????? - Batman CSF.
 197? - Set No. 6140901 - Spider-Man CSF.

Post-Vertibird Era similar sets, spin-offs and knock-offs

BlueBird Toys:
 19?? - Set No. ???? - Chopper Ace.  Twin Rotor design but otherwise similar to VertiBird operation and control.  European and Canadian Sales.

Milton Bradley Company (Canada):
 1993 - Set No. ???? - Flying Thunder. This helicopter bore a physical resemblance to "Blue Thunder" from the 1983 action film of the same name. Contained numerous "target" pick-up items and military-themed vinyl play-mat.

Galoob Micro Machines:
 1994 - Set No. ???? - Micro Machines Chopper Command Base.

Kool Toyz, contracted for Target Stores and KayBee Toys by Jasman Toys:
 2000 - Set No. 087 07 1039 - Chopper Command Helicopter Set.
 2000 - Set No. 087 07 1039 - Chopper Command Helicopter Set.  This Chopper Patrol with a safety ring three-bladed rotor shipped to stores in a Chopper Command box. A two-bladed rotor was mistakenly shown in the picture on the box.

Jasman Toys Chopper Command:
 2000 - Set No. 16810-015 - Chopper Command Police (with play-mat).
 2000 - Set No. 16810-016 - Chopper Command Military (with play-mat).
 2000 - Set No. 16812-001 - Chopper Command Police (with play-mat, sound, flashing strobe).
 2000 - Set No. 16812-002, UPC 738708168127, C16812053 - Chopper Command Military (with play-mat, sound, flashing strobe).
 2000 - Set No. 16812-001 (2nd Printing) - Chopper Command Police (with play-mat, sound, flashing strobe)
 2000 - Set No. 16812-002 (2nd Printing) - Chopper Command Military (with play-mat, sound, flashing strobe).

Jasman Toys Chopper Patrol:
 2001 - Set No. 16810-??? - Chopper Command Police (with play-mat).
 2001 - Set No. 16810-??? - Chopper Command Military (with play-mat).
 2001 - Set No. 16812-??? - Chopper Command Police (with play-mat, sound, flashing strobe).
 2001 - Set No. 16813-??? - Chopper Command Military (with play-mat, sound, flashing strobe).
 2001 - Set No. 16816-??? - Chopper Command Sea Rescue (with play-mat, sound, flashing strobe).
 2001 - Set No. 16871-??? - Chopper Command Rega (with play-mat, sound, flashing strobe)  Swiss Rega contracted the set from Jasman.

Jasman Toys Command Force Chopper Patrol:
 200? - Set No. 16963-??? - Command Force Chopper Patrol, Micro Series, Apache.
 200? - Set No. 16964-??? - Command Force Chopper Patrol, Micro Series, Cobra.
 200? - Set No. 16992-??? - Command Force Chopper Patrol, Mini Series, Patrol AH-64 Apache. (with play-mat, light-up base, sounds, flashing strobe)
 200? - Set No. 16993-??? - Command Force Chopper Patrol, Mini Series, Patrol AH-1 Super Cobra. (with play-mat, light-up base, sounds, flashing strobe)
 200? - Set No. 16994-??? - Command Force Chopper Patrol, Mini Series, AH-6 Little Bird. (with play-mat, light-up base, sounds, flashing strobe)
 2007 - Set No. 1????-??? - Spider-Man 3 12" Chopper Chopper.  (Command Force sized AH-6 Little Bird. (with play-mat, light-up base, sounds, flashing strobe)
 2??? - Set No. 255590-??? - Command Force Chopper Countdown. (with play-mat, light-up base, sounds, flashing strobe, countdown timer)

Jasman Toys Spider-Man 3:
 2007 - Set No. 23530-??? - Spider-Man 3 12" Chopper.  (Command Force size)
 2007 - Set No. 2????-??? - Spider-Man 3 Flying Figure.  (Command Force size)
 2007 - Set No. 2????-??? - Spider-Man 3 18" Chopper.  (with play-mat)(Command Force size)
 2007 - Set No. 2????-??? - Spider-Man 3 Amazing Spider-Man Chopper.  (with play-mat, sound, light-up base)(Chopper Patrol size)

RoboFly custom Set:
 2000 - Set No. ???? - RoboFly.  Custom-produced all aluminum, CNC machined, super-powered VertiBird knock-off.  Magnetic pickup instead of SkyHook.  The set includes numbered and personalized plates for the owner.  The RoboFly maker also sent out a free customized keychain fob to the owners and all others who requested them.

Draganfly Innovations.  Acquired RoboFly production rights:
 2000 - Set No. ???? - Skybot.  Same as the RoboFly except no owner personalization. No longer manufactured.

References

VertiBird links
 VertiSim - Free Vertibird Simulator for Windows
 Stuff We Love - 1970s Nostalgia site featuring many toys from the era

VertiBird videos
 1973 Vertibird commercial - USA Air Police

1970s toys
Helicopters
Mattel
Products introduced in 1971
Space Age